Rakkaus tulessa is the thirty-eighth album by Finnish experimental rock band Circle, a collaboration with Finnish electronic music pioneer Erkki Kurenniemi. The album was released in July 2011 to coincide with Kurenniemi's seventieth birthday. The vinyl-only album marries together two recordings - vocals by Kurenniemi recorded in 1972, and Krautrock-style music by Circle from 1999. The two elements were subsequently "mashed-up" (as the sleevenotes describe it) by Circle bassist and bandleader Jussi Lehtisalo and longtime Circle sound engineer Tuomas Laurila. The album was co-produced by filmmaker Mika Taanila who in 2002 made a documentary film on Kurenniemi, called The Future Is Not What It Used To Be.

Track listing
A1 Kello 12:15 (9:44)
A2 Latentti liike-energia (13:50)
B1 Me-me-me-me (0:46)
B2 Tuulispää (3:22)
B3 Valheiden läpi (5:10)
B4 Kaksi kiveä (13:31)

Circle (band) albums
2011 albums